The Boston University Terriers represent Boston University in Women's Hockey East Association during the 2017–18 NCAA Division I women's ice hockey season.

Offseason
May 11: Alumni Marie-Philip Puolin ('15) and Jenn Wakefield ('12) are members of Canada's Centralization roster. 23 of the 28 players on this roster will be chosen to represent Canada in the 2018 Olympics.

Recruiting

Standings

2017–18 Terriers

2017–18 Schedule

|- 
!colspan=12 style="background:red;color:#FFFFFF"| Regular Season

|-
!colspan=12 style="background:red;color:#FFFFFF"| WHEA Tournament

Awards and honors

References

Boston University
Boston University Terriers women's ice hockey seasons